La Barque Creek is a stream in Jefferson County in the U.S. state of Missouri. It is a tributary of the Meramec River.

La Barque is a name derived from the French denoting "the boat".

See also
List of rivers of Missouri

References

Rivers of Jefferson County, Missouri
Rivers of Missouri